Elephant in the Room is a stand up comedy special by comedian Patrice O'Neal, released by Comedy Central. It premiered on February 19, 2011, nine months before O'Neal's death. It is the comedian's only "hour-length" special and his first to be released on DVD or CD. The DVD was released by Comedy Central on February 22, 2011. Although the original televised version ran only 42 minutes (an hour with commercials), the full-length edit released on DVD and Netflix's streaming service runs at 77 minutes. The DVD includes additional "deleted scenes" as well as O'Neal's 2003 Comedy Central Presents, available on DVD for the first time.

References

2011 comedy films
Television shows directed by Beth McCarthy-Miller
2010s English-language films